Counter Play is an Australian television drama series screening on Nine Network's 9Gem in 2018. Created by Chrys Phillips, the series centres around the residents of the high-end affluent town of South Point.

Plot
The series begins with lead protagonist Jake Spector (Tyson Martick) returning to town, years after his near fatal accident with the sole objective of revenge. Oblivious to Jake's true identity and devious plan his girlfriend, Faith Morgan (Mikaela Phillips) is unaware of his plan. Morgan's family are amongst the town's founders and her father has a powerful royal family history. Jake plans to terrorise both his old friends and his first love Riley Cornwall (Isabel Dilena) for what they did to him that evening after high school graduation he begins a vengeful game of "play or be played" scenarios intended to reveal everyone's lies. However, as the scenarios progress there is the increasing sign Jake may not be the only one involved with the threatening notes and is someone else infiltrating his game.

Production
Counter Play was originally launched as a six-part web-series in 2016 and achieved major online success with 1.5 million total views. Joint producers Chrys and Mikaela Phillips decided to continue the series into Season 2 with plans for a commercial platform. Filming since October 2017, two seasons of the show were completed by May 2018 with plans for season 3 commencing mid-late 2018.

Cast and characters
 Tyson Martick – Jake Spector/Aaron Robertson
 Mikaela Phillips – Faith Morgan
 Michelle Rowley – Mrs Heather Cornwall
 Isabel Dilena – Riley Cornwall
 Victor Gralak – Wes Morgan
 Luke Styles – Mayor Ferguson
 Sophie Thurling – Amber Rose
 Leigh Smith – Tim

Broadcast
The series will premiere in Australia on Nine Network's 9Gem in 2018. The program was acquired by Amazon Video in the United States and officially premiered on August 27, 2018, and is available to stream in Australia. The show is also currently in negotiations with networks in the UK, New Zealand and Asia.

References

Nine Network original programming
Australian drama television series
Television shows set in Victoria (Australia)
2018 Australian television series debuts